Ctenomeristis kaltenbachi is a species of snout moth in the genus Ctenomeristis. It was described by Rolf-Ulrich Roesler in 1983 and is known from Sumatra, Indonesia.

References

Moths described in 1983
Phycitini